Hadena syriaca is a species of moth of the family Noctuidae. It is found in Italy, the Balkans, south-eastern Europe, Turkey, Transcaucasia, Israel, Syria and Jordan, Iran, Pakistan and Egypt.

Adults are on wing from February to May. There is one generation per year.

The larvae probably feed on capsules of Caryophyllaceae species.

Subspecies
Hadena syriaca podolica (Iran)
Hadena syriaca imitaria
Hadena syriaca petroffi (Egypt)
Hadena syriaca quetta

External links
 Hadeninae of Israel

Hadena
Moths of Europe
Moths of Asia
Moths of Africa
Moths described in 1933